Islay Province is the smallest of eight provinces in the Arequipa Region of Peru.

Political division
The province is divided into six districts which are:

 Cocachacra (Cocachacra)
 Dean Valdivia (La Curva)
 Islay (Islay)
 Mejía (Mejía)
 Mollendo (Mollendo)
 Punta de Bombon (Punta de Bombon)

Ethnic groups 
The province is inhabited by indigenous citizens of Aymara and Quechua descent. Spanish, however, is the language which the majority of the population (85.11%) learnt to speak in childhood, 10.59% of the residents started speaking using the Quechua language and  3.24% using Aymara (2007 Peru Census).

Sources

External links 
  Official website

Provinces of the Arequipa Region